Dolfak Rural District is a rural district (dehestan) in Khorgam District, Rudbar County, Gilan Province, Iran. At the 2006 census, its population was 3,242, in 875 families. The rural district has 8 villages.

References 

Rural Districts of Gilan Province
Rudbar County